These are the official results of the Women's 200 metres event at the 1999 IAAF World Championships in Seville, Spain. There were a total number of 47 participating athletes, with seven qualifying heats, four quarter-finals, two semi-finals and the final held on Friday 27 August 1999 at 19:45h.

Final

Semi-final
Held on Wednesday 25 August 1999

Quarter-finals
Held on Tuesday 24 August 1999

Heats
Held on Tuesday 24 August 1999

References
 

H
200 metres at the World Athletics Championships
1999 in women's athletics